Events in the year 1856 in Iceland.

Incumbents 

 Monarch: Frederick VII of Denmark
 Council President of Denmark: Peter Georg Bang (until 18 October); Carl Christian Hall onwards

Births 

 27 September − Bríet Bjarnhéðinsdóttir, women's rights advocate.
 19 October − Elín Briem, teacher and writer.
 26 October − Baldwin Baldwinson, Icelandic born Canadian politician.

References 

 
1850s in Iceland
Years of the 19th century in Iceland
Iceland
Iceland